John Van Cott (September 7, 1814 – February 18, 1883) was a prominent member of the Church of Jesus Christ of Latter-day Saints serving as a member of the Quorum of the Seventy, as one of the Seven Presidents of the Seventy, and also as president of the Scandinavian Mission.

Early life and conversion
John Van Cott was descended from a Dutch settler named Claes Cornelissen Van Cott who came from Holland to what is now New York [Nieuw Amsterdam] in 1662.  His father died of consumption when John was 10 years old. He first heard of The Book of Mormon and the Church of Jesus Christ of Latter Day Saints from his cousin LDS Apostle Parley P. Pratt who was seven years his senior. (John's mother, Lovina Pratt and Parley's father, Jared, were siblings.) Some accounts put this first introduction as early as 1833 but, unlike his cousin, he did not join for some time. In 1835 he married Lucy Sackett and they had four children in Canaan, New York. There is some disagreement regarding whether their family name links to a famous old Van Cats family of Holland. While some claim no official proof of the connection, and assert there has been no acceptance of any claims of the connection between these two different family names made by any Dutch officials, there is ample genealogical work to demonstrate a reasonable connection through Claes Van Cats, who emigrated to America in 1652 as a boy. Claes Van Cats subsequently married Catalyn Jans in 1670. Their line continued through Johannes Van Cats (1674) to Nicolaes Van Cats (1715) and on to Johannes (John) Van Cott (baptized 1747), finally arriving at Losee Van Cott, John Van Cott's father. The Van Cott line can be traced back from Claes to the first Lord Giselbert Van Welle, Lord Van Cats, who was born about the year 1060. 

In 1843, Lucy joined the Latter Day Saint church. Historical material is somewhat sketchy here as most sources say that Van Cott himself was baptized by Pratt in Nauvoo in 1844 or 45, but others imply that the family moved to Nauvoo after he was baptized. Records are consistent in saying that the family was in Nauvoo in 1846 and stayed for a time at Pratt's home and that Van Cott donated about $400 towards the completion of the Nauvoo Temple.

Pioneer and church servant
The winter of 1846 was spent at Winter Quarters, where Van Cott became well acquainted with Brigham Young. According to historical records, he was chosen to be a bishop at this time to watch after the families of men who had joined the Mormon Battalion. He was ordained a Seventy on February 25, 1847.

As a Mormon pioneer, John made the "trip across the plains" multiple times. In 1847 he, his wife, two children (their two other children died in New York), and 59-year-old mother traveled with the Daniel Spencer/Perrigrine Sessions Company, wherein John was appointed to be a "captain of 10" and a marshal. They arrived in the Salt Lake Valley on September 25.

After arriving in the valley, at the behest of Young, Van Cott went back out on the trail to assist other companies who were having difficulties.  He assisted in the exploration of the new land. He was chosen to be the first marshal of Salt Lake City.

In 1852 Van Cott began a four-year assignment as the president of the Scandinavia Mission, headquartered in Denmark. He was called to the same assignment again in 1859 and served for two-and-a-half years. He became proficient in Danish as a result of his work there.

On the journey home to Utah, Van Cott led a group of church members from Scandinavia to the United States aboard the ship Waldemar, and then on the journey across the midwest to Salt Lake.  He is listed as being the President of the Madsen and Liljenquist companies, leading a group of Scandinavian Saints to Salt Lake in July–Sept 1862. This may be the same group he led on the Waldemar, but further information is needed.

In 1862 Van Cott was sustained as one of the Seven Presidents of the Seventy.  He died at his home a short distance south of Salt Lake City, February 18, 1883, after a lingering illness of several months.

Family
Like several church leaders of his time, John Van Cott was instructed to practice plural marriage. He had five wives and 28 children. His first child was born in 1838, his last in 1878. Some did not live to see adulthood, while others did; some became prominent members of their communities. He has thousands of descendants.

His wives and children:

Lucy Lavina Sackett

July 17, 1815, Stephentown, Columbia, New York – January 31, 1902, Salt Lake City, Utah; married September 15, 1835

Martha Van Cott (February 29, 1838 [sic], Canaan, Columbia, New York – March 25, 1908, Salt Lake City), married William Price
Lucy Van Cott (December 16, 1839, Canaan, Columbia, New York – September 9, 1843, Canaan, Columbia, New York), buried near her brother, John Losee Van Cott, and their grandfather, Losee Van Cott
John Losee Van Cott (January 16, 1842, Canaan, Columbia, New York – November 6, 1843, Canaan, Columbia, New York), buried there near the Van Cott family farm
Mary Van Cott (February 2, 1844, Elmira, New York – January 15, 1884, Salt Lake City), married James Cobb, Brigham Young
Losee Van Cott (August 23, 1847, Independence Rock, Natrona, Wyoming – March 18, 1851, Salt Lake City)
Fannie Van Cott (April 18, 1850, Salt Lake City – December 21, 1930, Colonia Dublan, Chihuahua Mexico), married Alexander Findlay MacDonald
Byron Van Cott (March 2, 1852, Salt Lake City – November 19, 1853, Salt Lake City)

Jemima Morris

August 4, 1831, North Coleford, Gloucestershire, England – March 23, 1851, Salt Lake City; married May 2, 1849

Morris Van Cott (March 14, 1851, Salt Lake City – March 16, 1851, Salt Lake City)

Caroline Amelia Pratt

January 20, 1840, Detroit, Wayne, Michigan – October 10, 1915, Salt Lake City; married February 12, 1857

Orson Van Cott (April 21, 1859, Salt Lake City – May 8, 1859, Salt Lake City)
Anson Van Cott (April 21, 1859, Salt Lake City – April 21, 1859, Salt Lake City)
Viola Van Cott (June 19, 1860, Salt Lake City – May 17, 1931, Salt Lake City), married Niels Joseph Madsen
Oscar Van Cott (September 17, 1863, Salt Lake City – June 9, 1955, Salt Lake City), married Ida Quayle
Marlon Van Cott (October 10, 1867, Salt Lake City – July 29, 1941, Salt Lake City), married Sarah Ellen Gabbott, Sarah Jane Ottenger Rust
Ray Van Cott (October 27, 1869, Salt Lake City – March 18, 1944), married Ida Moyle
Harold Van Cott (July 8, 1873, Salt Lake City – May 15, 1934), married Ella McAllister Sheets
Edith Van Cott (March 25, 1875, Salt Lake City – February 22, 1941, Los Angeles, California), married Ezra Thompson Palmer
Lavinia Van Cott (January 15, 1877, Salt Lake City – October 27, 1964, Salt Lake City), married Joseph Alfred White

Laura Christina Petra Lund

February 27, 1843, Holmen, Copenhagen, Denmark – December 1, 1913, Salt Lake City; married February 12, 1857

Agnes Van Cott (May 9, 1858, Salt Lake City – January 6, 1859, Salt Lake City)
Waldemar Van Cott (December 11, 1859, Salt Lake City – January 15, 1940, Salt Lake City), married Ella Catherine Quayle
Frank Victor Van Cott (August 7, 1863, Salt Lake City – August 17, 1938, Salt Lake City), married Annie Mary Anderson
Lucy May Van Cott (May 5, 1869, Salt Lake City – September 28, 1958)
Roy Van Cott (January 12, 1872, Salt Lake City – 1876)
Ernest Van Cott (December 18, 1875, Salt Lake City – August 27, 1924), married May Siddoway

Caroline Lena Caisa Erickson

June 27, 1833, Brevik, Skaraborg, Sweden – November 14, 1901, Salt Lake City; married November 22, 1862

Selma Van Cott (November 12, 1863, Salt Lake City – December 5, 1935, Salt Lake City), married William Whitaker Taylor (son of John Taylor), Lehi Pratt
Nephi Van Cott (February 25, 1865, Salt Lake City – September 18, 1865, Salt Lake City)
Albert Van Cott (December 25, 1868, Salt Lake City – November 10, 1959, Salt Lake City), married Margaret Burns South
Olive (or Olivia) Van Cott (April 27, 1875, Ephraim, Sanpete, Utah – August 27, 1935, Salt Lake City), married Thomas Stafford Davis
Enoch Van Cott (January 7, 1878, Salt Lake City – August 12, 1952), married Clara Harriet Bailey

Gallery

Other People named John Van Cott
According to historical records, a John Van Cott was "elected" a fireman in Brooklyn, NY on April 1, 1788. He held the post for 3 years. See this external link
John Waldemar Van Cott, a grandson of John Van Cott was a professor at Brigham Young University and an author; among his books is "Utah Place Names."

References

External links
 Brief History of the Scandinavian Mission
John Van Cot's diary from at L. Tom Perry Special Collections, Brigham Young University
 Mormon Pioneers Overland Travel Directory:  John Van Cott
 Van Cott book at the library of Congress
 A narrative of the journey from Scandinavia to America by a passenger in the company of Van Cott
 Excerpt of a book about rescuing some stranded handcart companies, Van Cott was part of the rescue.
 John Van Cott chosen as a Bishop
 A letter written to John Van Cott about the Scandinavian saints crossing the plains in America
 He is number 14 on this family history chart
 Materials relating to John Van Cott at the L. Tom Perry Special Collections, Harold B. Lee Library, Brigham Young University

1814 births
1883 deaths
19th-century Mormon missionaries
American Mormon missionaries in Denmark
American Mormon missionaries in Norway
American Mormon missionaries in Sweden
American general authorities (LDS Church)
Burials at Salt Lake City Cemetery
Converts to Mormonism
Latter Day Saints from Illinois
Latter Day Saints from New York (state)
Latter Day Saints from Utah
Mission presidents (LDS Church)
Mormon pioneers
Presidents of the Seventy (LDS Church)
Religious leaders from New York (state)